In optics, the Fraunhofer diffraction equation is used to model the diffraction of waves when the diffraction pattern is viewed at a long distance from the diffracting object, and also when it is viewed at the focal plane of an imaging lens.

The equation was named in honour of Joseph von Fraunhofer although he was not actually involved in the development of the theory.

This article gives the equation in various mathematical forms, and provides detailed calculations of the Fraunhofer diffraction pattern for several different forms of diffracting apertures, specially for normally incident monochromatic plane wave. A qualitative discussion of Fraunhofer diffraction can be found elsewhere.

Definition

When a beam of light is partly blocked by an obstacle, some of the light is scattered around the object, and light and dark bands are often seen at the edge of the shadow – this effect is known as diffraction. The Kirchhoff diffraction equation provides an expression, derived from the wave equation, which describes the wave diffracted by an aperture; analytical solutions to this equation are not available for most configurations.

The Fraunhofer diffraction equation is an approximation which can be applied when the diffracted wave is observed in the far field, and also when a lens is used to focus the diffracted light; in many instances, a simple analytical solution is available to the Fraunhofer equation – several of these are derived below.

In Cartesian coordinates

 If the aperture is in  plane, with the origin in the aperture and is illuminated by a monochromatic wave, of wavelength λ, wavenumber  with complex amplitude , and the diffracted wave is observed in the unprimed -plane along the positive -axis, where  are the direction cosines of the point  with respect to the origin. The complex amplitude  of the diffracted wave is given by the Fraunhofer diffraction equation as:

It can be seen from this equation that the form of the diffraction pattern depends only on the direction of viewing, so the diffraction pattern changes in size but not in form with change of viewing distance.

The Fraunhofer diffraction equation can be expressed in a variety of mathematically equivalent forms. For example:

It can be seen that the integral in the above equations is the Fourier transform of the aperture function evaluated at frequencies.

Thus, we can also write the equation in terms of a Fourier transform as:

The Fourier transform formulation can be very useful in solving diffraction problems.

Another form is:

where  represent the observation point and a point in the aperture respectively,  and  represent the wave vectors of the disturbance at the aperture and of the diffracted waves respectively, and  represents the magnitude of the disturbance at the aperture.

In polar coordinates

When the diffracting aperture has circular symmetry, it is useful to use polar rather than Cartesian coordinates.

A point in the aperture has coordinates  giving:

and

Using the integral representation of the Bessel function:

we have

In this case, we have  equal to the Fourier–Bessel or Hankel transform of the aperture function,

Example

Here are given examples of Fraunhofer diffraction with a normally incident monochromatic plane wave.

In each case, the diffracting object is located in the  plane, and the complex amplitude of the incident plane wave is given by

where
 is the magnitude of the wave disturbance,
 is the wavelength,
 is the velocity of light,
 is the time
 =  is the wave number

and the phase is zero at time .

The time dependent factor is omitted throughout the calculations, as it remains constant, and is averaged out when the intensity is calculated.

These derivations can be found in most standard optics books, in slightly different forms using varying notations. A reference is given for each of the systems modelled here. The Fourier transforms used can be found here.

Narrow rectangular slit

The aperture is a slit of width  which is located along the -axis,

Solution by integration 

Using Euler's formula, this can be simplified to:

where .

This can also be written as:

where  is the angle between z-axis and the line joining  to the origin and  when .

Fourier transform solution 
The slit can be represented by the rect function as:

The Fourier transform of this function is given by

where  is the Fourier transform frequency, and the  function is here defined as 

Intensity 
The intensity is proportional to the square of the amplitude, and is therefore

Apertures

Rectangular aperture

When a rectangular slit of width W and height H is illuminated normally (the slit illuminated at the normal angle) by a monochromatic plane wave of wavelength , the complex amplitude can be found using similar analyses to those in the previous section, applied over two independent orthogonal dimensions as:

The intensity is given by

If the height H of the slit is much greater than its width W, then the spacing of the vertical (along the height or the  axis) diffraction fringes is much less than the spacing of the horizontal (along the width or  axis) fringes. If the vertical fringe spacing is so less by a relatively so large H, then the observation of the vertical fringes is so hard that a person observing the diffracted wave intensity pattern on the plane of observation or the image plane recognizes only the horizontal fringes with their narrow height. This is the reason why a height-long slit or slit array such as a diffraction grating is typically analyzed only in the dimension along the width. If the illuminating beam does not illuminate the whole height of the slit, then the spacing of the vertical fringes is determined by the dimension of the laser beam along the slit height. Close examination of the two-slit pattern below shows that there are very fine vertical diffraction fringes above and below the main spots, as well as the more obvious horizontal fringes.

Circular aperture
The aperture has diameter . The complex amplitude in the observation plane is given by

Solution by integration 
Using the recurrence relationship

to give

If we substitute

Putting , we get

Solution using Fourier–Bessel transform 
We can write the aperture function as a step function

The Fourier–Bessel transform for this function is given by the relationship

Thus, we get

Intensity 
The intensity is given by:

Form of the diffraction pattern

This known as the Airy diffraction pattern

The diffracted pattern is symmetric about the normal axis.

Aperture with a Gaussian profile

An aperture with a Gaussian profile, for example, a photographic slide whose transmission has a Gaussian variation, so that the amplitude at a point in the aperture located at a distance r''' from the origin is given by

giving

 Solution using Fourier–Bessel transform 
The Fourier–Bessel or Hankel transform is defined as

The Hankel transform is

giving

and

 Intensity 
The intensity is given by:

This function is plotted on the right, and it can be seen that, unlike the diffraction patterns produced by rectangular or circular apertures, it has no secondary rings. This can be used in a process called apodization - the aperture is covered by a filter whose transmission varies as a Gaussian function, giving a diffraction pattern with no secondary rings.

Slits

Two slits
The pattern which occurs when light diffracted from two slits overlaps is of considerable interest in physics, firstly for its importance in establishing the wave theory of light through Young's interference experiment, and secondly because of its role as a thought experiment in double-slit experiment in quantum mechanics.

Narrow slits
right|thumb|Two slit interference using a red laserAssume we have two long slits illuminated by a plane wave of wavelength . The slits are in the  plane, parallel to the  axis, separated by a distance  and are symmetrical about the origin. The width of the slits is small compared with the wavelength.

 Solution by integration 
The incident light is diffracted by the slits into uniform spherical waves. The waves travelling in a given direction  from the two slits have differing phases.

The complex amplitude of the summed waves is given by:

 Solution using Fourier transform 
The aperture can be represented by the function:

where  is the delta function.

We have

and

giving

This is the same expression as that derived above by integration.

 Intensity 
This gives the intensity of the combined waves as:

Slits of finite width

 The width of the slits,  is finite.

 Solution by integration 
The diffracted pattern is given by:

 Solution using Fourier transform 
The aperture function is given by:

The Fourier transform of this function is given by

where  is the Fourier transform frequency, and the  function is here defined as 
and

We have

or

This is the same expression as was derived by integration.

 Intensity 
The intensity is given by:

It can be seen that the form of the intensity pattern is the product of the individual slit diffraction pattern, and the interference pattern which would be obtained with slits of negligible width. This is illustrated in the image at the right which shows single slit diffraction by a laser beam, and also the diffraction/interference pattern given by two identical slits.

Gratings

A grating is defined in Born and Wolf as "any arrangement which imposes on an incident wave a periodic variation of amplitude or phase, or both".

Narrow slit grating

 Solution by integration 
The complex amplitude of the diffracted wave at an angle  is given by:

since this is the sum of a geometric series.

 Solution using Fourier transform 
The aperture is given by

The Fourier transform of this function is:

 Intensity 
thumb|200px|right|Detail of main maximum in 20 and 50 narrow slit grating diffraction patternsThe intensity is given by:

This function has a series of maxima and minima. There are regularly spaced "principal maxima", and a number of much smaller maxima in between the principal maxima. The principal maxima occur when

and the main diffracted beams therefore occur at angles:

This is the grating equation for normally incident light.

The form of the pattern for =50 is shown in the first figure .

The detailed structure for 20 and 50 slits gratings are illustrated in the second diagram.

Finite width slit grating

The grating now has N'' slits of width  and spacing

Solution using integration 
The amplitude is given by:

Solution using Fourier transform 
The aperture function can be written as:

where  denotes the convolution operation, then we also have

we can write the aperture function as

The amplitude is then given by the Fourier transform of this expression as:

Intensity 
The intensity is given by:

The diagram shows the diffraction pattern for a grating with 20 slits, where the width of the slits is 1/5th of the slit separation. The size of the main diffracted peaks is modulated with the diffraction pattern of the individual slits.

Other gratings

The Fourier transform method above can be used to find the form of the diffraction for any periodic structure where the Fourier transform of the structure is known. Goodman uses this method to derive expressions for the diffraction pattern obtained with sinusoidal amplitude and phase modulation gratings. These are of particular interest in holography.

Extensions

Non-normal illumination

If the aperture is illuminated by a monochromatic plane wave incident in a direction , the first version of the Fraunhofer equation above becomes:

The grating equation becomes

Non-monochromatic illumination

In all of the above examples of Fraunhofer diffraction, the effect of increasing the wavelength of the illuminating light is to reduce the size of the diffraction structure, and conversely, when the wavelength is reduced, the size of the pattern increases. If the light is not mono-chromatic, i.e. it consists of a range of different wavelengths, each wavelength is diffracted into a pattern of a slightly different size to its neighbours. If the spread of wavelengths is significantly smaller than the mean wavelength, the individual patterns will vary very little in size, and so the basic diffraction will still appear with slightly reduced contrast. As the spread of wavelengths is increased, the number of "fringes" which can be observed is reduced.

See also 
Kirchhoff's diffraction formula
Fresnel diffraction
Huygens principle
Airy disc
Fourier optics

References 

Diffraction
Fourier analysis